Briana Venskus-Vazquez (born August 19, 1987) is an American actress. Daughter of John Venskus and Josephine Vazquez. She is best known for her roles as Agent Susan Vasquez on The CW series Supergirl (2015–2017), Beatrice on the AMC series The Walking Dead (2016–2020), and Agent Piper on the ABC series Agents of S.H.I.E.L.D. (2016–2020).

Career
Briana Venskus has appeared in numerous TV shows including House, The Vampire Diaries, Nashville and the movie Let's Be Cops. She is also one of the few actors to have performed in both Marvel Studios and DC Entertainment productions; Agents of S.H.I.E.L.D. for Marvel and Supergirl and Wonder Woman for DC.

Personal life
Venskus-Vazquez is Lithuanian and Puerto Rican, she identifies as bisexual after coming out at around 15 years old. She has criticized the Hollywood system over its casting of LGBTQ characters and actors as she had once lost a role for reportedly not being "authentically LGBTQ enough".

Filmography

References

External links
 

Living people
1987 births
Bisexual actresses
Bisexual women
American actresses of Puerto Rican descent
American people of Lithuanian descent
American television actresses
Actresses from North Carolina
People from Wilmington, North Carolina
21st-century American LGBT people
21st-century American women
American bisexual actors